The following article presents a summary of the 2009-10 football season in Venezuela.

Primera División

Venezuela national team
This section will cover Venezuela's games from August 12, 2009 until June 2010.

KEY:F = Friendly matchWCQ2010 = 2010 FIFA World Cup qualification''

External links
FVF's official website 

 
Seasons in Venezuelan football